Gatwick Express is an express rail passenger service between , Gatwick Airport, and  in South East England. It is the brand name used by the Govia Thameslink Railway train operating company on the Gatwick Express route of the Thameslink, Southern and Great Northern franchise.

The service began in May 1984 with air-conditioned InterCity carriages operated by British Rail. When it was privatised in April 1996, National Express took over the franchise. In June 2008, Gatwick Express ceased to exist as a separate franchise, when it was merged into the Southern train operating company, although it continues to be maintained as a separate identity. In July 2015, Southern including the Gatwick Express service was merged into Govia Thameslink Railway.

The service was suspended on 30 March 2020, following the drop in passenger numbers as a result of the COVID-19 pandemic resuming briefly in December 2021, but was suspended again shortly after following the impact of the Omicron variant. A reduced service, as a result of engineering work at Gatwick Airport Station resumed on 3 April 2022.

History 

Gatwick Airport railway station opened in June 1958. Initially, the rail service was provided entirely by London to Brighton stopping services, but more trains began to call with the introduction of the summer timetable in June 1958. One of the key elements of this was the extension of Three Bridges to Bognor Regis stopping services to start and terminate at London Victoria. These trains would run through a reversible platform at Gatwick where a portion would detach and wait in the platform for passengers until the next up train from Bognor Regis was attached and the train would depart for Victoria. For this service British Rail used a small batch of seven Class 402 2HALs in order to work with the trains used on the Bognor Regis services, suitable for airport link use because of their larger luggage space.

This situation lasted until the early 1970s when increased passenger and luggage travel to the station was rendering the old system obsolete. British Rail therefore decided to adapt a number of Class 423 4VEPs with increased luggage capacity (at the expense of fewer second class seats) and were redesignated as Class 427 4VEGs. The service however remained much the same, with the units attaching and detaching from Bognor Regis bound services running via Redhill. This led to somewhat extended journey times which meant the service lacked any real purpose, as the faster services began calling at Gatwick Airport from the early 1970s, and made the option of travelling to Gatwick from London on the service lack appeal to those who knew better.

In 1975 British Airports Authority airport director John Mulkern, British Caledonian Airways chairman Adam Thomson and British Rail's Southern Region regional manager Bob Reid, formed the Gatwick Liaison Group to discuss matters of mutual interest.

As a subsidiary of this, the Gatwick Promotion Group, under the chairmanship of the airport public relations manager David Hurst, was formed to market the airport. One of the first successes of the group was to persuade the British Rail board to redevelop Gatwick station by building a raft over the platforms, and this was opened by British Rail chairman Peter Parker in 1980. It was a long-term aim of the group to have a non-stop service between the airport and central London in order to counter the perceived distance from the capital, for both UK and overseas passengers.

At first the service from Bognor Regis, which by this stage only stopped at East Croydon, was branded Rapid City Link.

Express service 

In May 1984, the non-stop Gatwick Express service began, using Class 73s with Mark 2 carriages. Later, the duties we taken over by Class 488 and Class 489. A 30-minute journey time was advertised, although some journeys would take nearer 35 minutes, especially during peak hours.

Privatisation 

Gatwick Express was the first portion of British Rail's InterCity sector to be converted into a separate train operating unit, ready for franchising as a private business with the assets transferred to Gatwick Express Limited in March 1994. The Gatwick Express franchise was awarded by the Director of Passenger Rail Franchising to National Express with the franchise starting on 28 April 1996.

Operated by Southern 
In April 2007 the Department for Transport announced that the Gatwick Express franchise was to be incorporated into the South Central franchise and the services transferred to Southern on 22 June 2008.

On 20 August 2008 the Department for Transport announced that Abellio, Govia, National Express and Stagecoach had been shortlisted to bid for the new South Central franchise. On 9 June 2009 the Department for Transport announced that Govia had retained the franchise, beginning on 20 September 2009.

Operated by Govia Thameslink Railway 
The Department for Transport confirmed prior to the awarding of the new franchise that the Southern franchise would be merged at its conclusion in July 2015 into the proposed Thameslink, Southern and Great Northern franchise.

In March 2012 the Department for Transport announced that Abellio, FirstGroup, Govia, MTR and Stagecoach had been shortlisted to bid for the new franchise. The Invitation to Tender was to have been issued in October 2012, and the successful bidder announced in spring 2013. However, in the wake of the InterCity West Coast refranchising process collapsing, the Secretary of State for Transport announced in October 2012 that the process would be put on hold pending the results of a review.

With the last franchise expiring on 25 July 2015, the South Central franchise merged with the Thameslink Great Northern franchise to create Thameslink, Southern and Great Northern. This is operated by Govia Thameslink Railway, which is also owned by Southern's parent company, Govia. The Gatwick Express brand identity has been retained. Oyster cards and contactless payment cards have been accepted for travel between London Victoria and Gatwick Airport since January 2016.

Suspension 
On 30 March 2020, all Gatwick Express services were suspended until further notice, in part due to the COVID-19 pandemic.

As of 3 April 2022, services are now back and running, with Gatwick Express coaches returning from Southern.

Services 

On Sundays, the service pattern between London and the airport was unchanged but there were no extensions to or from Brighton. In December 2022, trains began calling at Haywards Heath every 30 minutes between Gatwick and Brighton.

Past services 

In April 2007 the Department for Transport announced that the Gatwick Express franchise was to be incorporated into the South Central franchise. as part of a plan to increase capacity on the Brighton Main Line. This change doubled the number of London-to-Brighton express trains during peak periods.

As part of the December 2015 timetable, Gatwick Express began serving Brighton all day (except on Sundays), with half-hourly services in the off-peak and evenings (while the remaining services continue to terminate at Gatwick Airport). Unlike peak-time services, these call at no intermediate stations between Brighton and the airport. These services replaced the half-hourly "express" services operated by Southern (which did not call at Gatwick Airport).

In May 2018, the stopping pattern for peak-time services was changed: all calls at Wivelsfield and Preston Park stations were withdrawn, Hassocks is now served by all peak Gatwick Express services every 15 minutes, while Burgess Hill and Haywards Heath are served half-hourly (by alternate services) in both directions. Services to and from Preston Park were restored in May 2019, though, with half-hourly calls made by the same trains that stop at Burgess Hill.

Ticketing 
London – Gatwick is one of the few journeys on the UK National Rail network for which tickets restricting travel to certain brands of service are available in addition to the option of standard inter-available fares for immediate travel as on all flows shared by different National Rail operators (although some restrictions may apply on cheaper tickets). Through tickets for which the Brighton Main Line is part of a permitted route are valid on the Gatwick Express service as with all other Govia Thameslink Railway services, the only exclusion being some tickets from London to stations south of Gatwick routed Not Gatwick Express.

Historically, standard Gatwick Express services did not charge penalty fares and permitted tickets to be purchased on board at no extra charge. Journeys to or from stations south of Gatwick were subject to penalty fares as normal. This rule applied to the six weekday services each way that start or end at Brighton.
However, in December 2011 electronic ticket gates were installed at Gatwick Airport and London Victoria platforms 13 and 14 (where the Gatwick Express arrives and departs), meaning that tickets can no longer be bought on the train and must be purchased either in advance or at the station before boarding.

London Oyster Cards and contactless cards have been accepted for travel since January 2016 between London Victoria and Gatwick Airport. The fare is charged differently at the Gatwick Express gateline at London Victoria station compared to other platforms which Southern services use.

Performance 
In May 2013 the Chairman of Gatwick Airport, Roy McNulty, criticised the Gatwick Express service for its overcrowding and old rolling stock. He said that the train service sometimes "at times veers towards Third World conditions" and that it gives air passengers arriving in the United Kingdom a bad first impression of the UK, and called for major improvements. Southern responded by stating that it had provided some 20,000 extra peak-hour seats every week on the London-Brighton line.

In August 2018 they were directed by the Advertising Standards Authority (an independent advertising regulator) to remove claims of a 30-minute journey time between London and Gatwick due to poor performance on the line.

Rolling stock 

Govia Thameslink Railway operates a fleet of Gatwick Express branded s which it received during 2016. GTR placed a £145.2million order with Bombardier for 27 sets of the type in November 2014 to replace the existing Class 442 Wessex Electrics.

The type underwent testing in July 2015, and began to enter passenger service in February 2016. The new trains have 12 carriages compared with 10 for the Class 442, and also feature additional luggage space, wireless internet connectivity and passenger service updates.

In April 2016, drivers belonging to the ASLEF trade union refused to pick up passengers on the new Class 387 trains. The trains are fitted with "Driver-Only Operation" (DOO) capability, meaning that the driver closes the doors using CCTV and decides that it is safe to move off, rather than a guard. DOO had been used on the previous 10-car Class 442, but the union claimed that extending this to 12-car trains put too much pressure on the driver and was unsafe. In response, GTR took legal action, and the union ultimately dropped the claim.

The Gatwick Express branded fleet is maintained at Lovers Walk Depot with stabling facilities provided at Stewarts Lane depot. Some classified overhaul work has also been undertaken at Hornsey EMU Depot taking advantage of the unit's dual voltage capability.

Current fleet

Past fleet 
Until 1984 the service was operated by Class 423 slam-door stock, coded 4-VEG (G for Gatwick).

From May 1984 Mark 2F stock released from Midland Main Line duties coupled to a Class 489 Gatwick Luggage Van took over the services, hauled by  locomotives.

A franchise commitment by National Express was the replacement of these with new stock, and eight Class 460 Junipers started to be delivered from January 1999. Because of reliability problems, some of the old stock remained in service until 2005.

To replace the last of the old stock, a pair of Class 458 Junipers were transferred from South West Trains for use as spares. They remained in their existing livery but with Gatwick Express branding. Their seating was modified from high density 3+2 seating configuration to 2+2 configuration, some seating being replaced with luggage racks. However, these units never entered service and returned to South West Trains. The Class 460s were withdrawn from service in September 2012 to be merged with the mechanically similar Class 458 units used by South West Trains in order to provide more stock at peak times.

The Gatwick Express service received 17 refurbished Class 442 Wessex Electrics from South West Trains from December 2008, followed by a further seven through leases in 2009, after Southern retained the South Central franchise. The additional rolling stock allowed Southern to provide extra capacity on the Gatwick Express services extended to Brighton. The stock were replaced during 2016 by newly built Class 387/2s.

See also 
Heathrow Express
Stansted Express
Airport rail link

References

Further reading

External links 

Gatwick
Airport rail links in the United Kingdom
Gatwick Airport
National Express companies
Rail transport in West Sussex
Railway operators in London
Railway services introduced in 1984
1984 establishments in England